The Swift is a line of laptop computers produced by Acer. They are designed to be lightweight and thinner than typical laptops. Laptops in the Swift series are the Swift 1, Swift 3, Swift 5 and Swift 7.

In a announcement in February,2023 Acer changed its model serial, with the Swift 3, Swift 5 and Swift 7 series renamed as the Swift Go, Swift and Swift X respectively.

List of Acer Aspire Swift models and specifications 

 S30-10
 SF113-31
 SF114-31
 SF314-51
 SF314-52
 SF314-52G
 SF314-53G
 SF314-54G
 SF314-55G
 SF314-56G
 SF314-57G
 SF314-58G
 SF314-59G 
 SF314-510G
 SF314-511
 SF315-51
 SF315-51G
 SF315-52
 SF514-51
 SF713-51
 SFX14-41G

Notes:

References 

Consumer electronics brands
Acer Inc. laptops